Malachi was a Jewish prophet in the Hebrew Bible.

Malachi may also refer to:

People
Malachi (given name)
Malachi Cush (born 1980), Irish singer who records under the mononym Malachi
John Malachi (1919–1987), American jazz pianist
Malachi Malasgrowther, a pseudonym used by writer Walter Scott in a series of letters to the Edinburgh Weekly Journal
Prince Malachi (born 1969), English reggae singer
Tau Malachi (born 1962), American neo-Gnostic religious leader

Arts and entertainment
Malachi (album), debut album of Malachi Cush
Malachi Constant, central character in Kurt Vonnegut's The Sirens of Titan
The Malachi Brothers, fictional characters and the main antagonists in the musical Happy Days

Other uses
Book of Malachi, a book of the Hebrew Bible
Malachi, Ontario, Canada, an unincorporated community

See also
Malachy (given name)
Malachai (disambiguation)